Fabio Paternò is Research Director and Head of the Laboratory on Human Interfaces in Information Systems at Istituto di Scienza e Tecnologie dell'Informazione, Consiglio Nazionale delle Ricerche in Pisa, Italy.

Career
He received his PhD in Computer Science from University of York (UK). He wrote one book on Model-Based Design and Evaluation of Interactive Applications, and has long been working on user interface modeling languages, and tools for design, development or evaluation of interactive systems. In the field of Task analysis he developed the ConcurTaskTrees notation for specifying task models, which has inspired the W3C document on Task Models. He then worked on the TERESA and MARIA XML languages for the logical description of multi-device user interfaces.

He has also investigated novel solutions for End-User development in various contexts. He coordinated a European Network of Excellence (EUD-net), co-edited (together with Henry Lieberman from MIT, and Volker Wulf from University of Siegen) one of the best-known books on End User Development (widely cited), and carried out various research studies in the area.  He has  actively worked at the design of various authoring environments and tools, such as Puzzle for intuitively editing interactive applications from a smartphone, a mashup tool for creating new Web applications by composing existing components using the familiar copy-paste interaction across them, and an environment for specifying trigger action rules able to personalize Internet of Things applications.

He has addressed research issues related to multi-device environments by proposing original solutions for migratory and cross-device user interfaces, which allow seamless access through a variety of devices ranging from wearable to large public displays, and dynamic allocation of interactive components across them. He also edited and wrote part of a book on Migratory Interactive Applications for Ubiquitous Environments.

He has been co-chair of the  World Wide Web Consortium (W3C) Group on Model-based User Interfaces.

He has been the chair of the International Federation for Information Processing's WG 2.7/13.4 group on user interface engineering.

He has been a member of the Programme Committee of the main international HCI conferences, including Papers Co-Chair of the ACM CHI 2000 conference, IFIP INTERACT 2003 and IFIP INTERACT 2005, and chair of MobileHCI 2002, EICS 2011, Ambient Intelligence 2012, ACM EICS 2014, Mobile HCI 2016, MUM 2019, and ACM IUI 2020

Awards
In 2009 he was appointed a Distinguished Scientist of the Association for Computing Machinery (ACM).

He has been awarded the IFIP Silver Core   in 2013, and the TC13 Pioneer in HCI in 2014.,, IFIP Fellow   in recognition of substantial and enduring contributions in the ICT field in 2020, and has been elected in the ACM SIGCHI Academy in 2021.

References

External links 
 Home page
 ACM interviews Fabio Paternò
 HIIS Laboratory Home page
 Google Scholar
 
 Migratory Interactive Applications for Ubiquitous Environments 
 Formal methods in Human Computer Interaction
 Mauve, an accessibility validator developed by HIIS Laboratory – ISTI of CNR of Pisa (Italy).

Human–computer interaction researchers
Living people
Year of birth missing (living people)
National Research Council (Italy) people